Gabriel de Saint-Aubin, also Gabriel Jacques de Saint-Aubin, (Paris, 14 April 1724 - Paris, 14 February 1780) was a French draftsman, printmaker, etcher and painter.

Biography

His brothers Charles Germain de Saint Aubin and Augustin de Saint-Aubin were also artists, as was his niece, Marie-François, daughter of Charles. He was a student of Étienne Jeaurat and Hyacinthe Collin de Vermont. After three failures to win a Prix de Rome from 1752 to 1754, he left the Académie des Beaux-Arts and joined the Guild of Saint Luke.

A distinctive aspect of Saint-Aubin's art is its inordinate fondness for observation of society on the streets of the capital, which he sketched scenes or entertainment in his wanderings. As such, his engravings etchings and large watercolors are a valuable record of the Parisian artistic life in the eighteenth century.
Gallery

References

 E. and J. de Goncourt, The Art of the eighteenth century, the Saint-Aubin
 Catalogue of rare and valuable books composing the library of Mr. Hippolyte Destailleur ... Paris: D. Morgand, 1891. 8 °, 448 p.

Further reading
 (see index, v.1).

External links

1724 births
1780 deaths
18th-century French painters
French male painters
French draughtsmen
French printmakers
18th-century French male artists